The 2019–20 Chattanooga Mocs men's basketball team represented the University of Tennessee at Chattanooga in the 2019–20 NCAA Division I men's basketball season. The Mocs, led by third-year head coach Lamont Paris, played their home games at McKenzie Arena in Chattanooga, Tennessee, as members of the Southern Conference. They finished the season 20–13, 10–8 in SoCon play to finish in a tie for fifth place. They defeated UNC Greensboro in the quarterfinals of the SoCon tournament before losing in the semifinals to Wofford.

Previous season
The Mocs finished the 2018–19 season 12–20 overall, 7–11 in SoCon play to finish in fifth place. In the SoCon tournament, they were defeated by East Tennessee State in the first round.

Roster

Schedule and results

|-
!colspan=12 style=| Exhibition

|-
!colspan=12 style=| Regular season

|-
!colspan=12 style=| SoCon tournament
|-

|-

Source

See also
 2019-20 Chattanooga Mocs women's basketball

References

Chattanooga Mocs men's basketball seasons
Chattanooga Mocs
Chattanooga Mocs men's basketball
Chattanooga Mocs men's basketball